On 19 April 2011, a Mil Mi-17 helicopter operated by Pawan Hans crashed near the town of Tawang, India, killing 17 of 23 people on board.

Accident
The helicopter had taken off at 12:45 pm from Borjhar Airport in Assam on an internal flight to the town of Tawang, in Tawang district, India. On board were 18 passengers and 5 crew. At around 13:50 pm, the helicopter arrived at destination, but while attempting to land at Tawang Civil helipad, which is located on top of a hill, the Mi-17 crashed into a gorge and caught fire.

Aircraft
The aircraft involved, a Mil Mi-17, registered VT-PHF, was also involved in a previous emergency landing in the same region.

Casualties
Seventeen of the 23 on board were killed, including three crew members. Out of the 17, two were minors. Two passengers survived the crash initially, but later died due to injuries from the post-crash fire.

Investigation
An official in the Directorate General of Civil Aviation (DGCA) said that as per initial reports the helicopter crash-landed "due to likely wind shear and downdraft while landing and caught fire on impact to the ground".-

References

Aviation accidents and incidents in 2011
Aviation accidents and incidents in India
Accidents and incidents involving the Mil Mi-8
2011 disasters in India
April 2011 events in India
Accidents and incidents involving the Mil Mi-17